This list of newspapers in Bangladesh is a list of newspapers printed and distributed in Bangladesh. Newspapers published in Bangladesh are written in Bengali or English language versions. Most Bangladeshi daily newspapers are usually printed in broadsheets; few daily tabloids exist. Daily newspapers in Bangladesh are published in the capital, Dhaka, as well as in major regional cities such as Chittagong, Khulna, Rajshahi, Sylhet and Barisal. All daily newspapers are morning editions; there are no evening editions in Bangladesh. Some newspapers offer online versions.

Notable daily newspapers

Bengali-language newspapers

English-language newspapers

Online newspapers and portals

Monthly/weekly newspapers and magazines
Monthly Bandhan-construction, Real estate, Interior & Architecture related Popular Monthly Magazine
 Forum, a human rights oriented magazine published between 1969 and 1971, re-established in 2006
 Dhaka Courier, English-language news magazine founded in 1984, it is the longest running English current affairs magazine in the country.
 Holiday, an English-language weekly newspaper
 ICE Today, an English-language fashion and lifestyle magazine
 Weekly Blitz, an English-language tabloid weekly founded in 2003 and edited by Salah Choudhury

News agencies
Before 1972, news agencies in Bangladesh were local branches of international agencies.
 Bangladesh Sangbad Sangstha (BSS), the official government-owned news agency of Bangladesh, was created on 1 January 1972 from the Dhaka bureau of the state-owned. Abul Kalam Azad, who was formerly Prime Minister Sheikh Hasina's press secretary, became its chief editor in 2014. Associated Press of Pakistan (APP) (no relation to Associated Press (AP)) was the previous name of this organization. But the name changed after independence of Bangladesh. It exchanges news with AFP, Xinhua, Press Trust of India (PTI), APP(Pakistan) and other foreign agencies. 
 United News of Bangladesh (UNB) is a private news agency in service since 1988. It partners with AP, United News of India (UNI), and other foreign agencies.

Defunct newspapers
 Ajker Kagoj ("Today's Paper"), a Bengali-language newspaper published in the modern approach between 1991 and 2007.
 Amar Desh ("My country"), a Bengali-language newspaper published between 2004 and 2013.
 The Bangladesh Observer, an English-language daily published between 1949-2010 and last edited by Iqbal Sobhan Chowdhury.
 Kishore Bangla, a Bengali juvenile weekly published between 1977 and 1983.
 Daily Banglar Bani, a Bengali-language newspaper with a pro-Awami League ideology.
 The Kohinoor, a Bengali-language monthly published from 1898 to 1912.

See also
 Mass media in Bangladesh
 Communications in Bangladesh

References 

Bangladesh
 
Newspapers